John Cummins may refer to:

John Cummins (Australian politician) (born 1944), former member of the South Australian House of Assembly
John Cummins (Canadian politician) (born 1942), Canadian politician
John Cummins (Gaelic footballer) (born 1948), Irish Gaelic footballer
John Cummins (Irish politician), Irish Fine Gael senator since 2020
John Cummins (union organiser) (1948–2006), Australian labour leader
John Adams Cummins (1835–1913), Hawaiian politician
John D. Cummins (1791–1849), U.S. Representative from Ohio
John Stephen Cummins (born 1928), American prelate of the Roman Catholic Church
John Swete Cummins (1811–1862), Irish-born municipal politician and writer in Canada
John William Cummins, American Speaker of the West Virginia House of Delegates (1929–1931)

See also
John R. Cummins Farmhouse (built 1879–1880), American National Register of Historic Places
John Cummings (disambiguation)
John Commins (disambiguation)
Jonathan Cummins, Canadian musician